Michel Pollentier (born 13 February 1951 in Diksmuide, West Flanders) is a Belgian former professional road bicycle racer.

He became professional in 1973. The highlight of his career was his overall win in the 1977 Giro d'Italia. Pollentier is one of just three Belgian riders to win the Giro, the others being Eddy Merckx and Johan de Muynck.

In the 1978 Tour de France, he was the Belgian national champion when he won the stage arriving in Alpe d'Huez, took the yellow jersey and would have been involved in a battle with Joop Zoetemelk and eventual winner Bernard Hinault for the remainder of the race as the three were within +0:30 of one another. However, he was accused of foul play in the succeeding doping test, having used what was described politely as a pear-shaped tube (in fact a condom) of different urine held under the armpit and connected by a plastic tube to give the impression of urinating. Pollentier was uncovered after another rider at the test had trouble operating his own system of tubes and aroused the suspicion of the doctor, who then demanded Pollentier lift his jersey to show if he too was cheating. He was put out of the Tour immediately.

The affair took away most of Pollentier's credibility in international cycling. Even though he won the 1980 edition of the Tour of Flanders and he also came 3rd in the 1982 Vuelta a España where he was the beneficiary of a doping incident when the initial winner was disqualified bringing him to 2nd overall. 1984 was his last professional season; he finished outside the top 10 at the Vuelta and won the final grand tour stage of his career.

After his cycling career, Pollentier became a car tyre garage owner and founded a cycling school.

In "Seigneurs et Forcats du Velo" by Olivier Dazat, Pollentier is quoted as saying that he and another named Belgian cycling champion of the era had trouble after their careers because of drugs they had taken while racing. Dazat quotes him as saying: "I've never hesitated to confess that I spent three weeks under the surveillance of Dr Dejonckheere at the St-Joseph clinic at Ostend and that after treatment... I stayed under his control for another two years. Why hide it? It's impossible to come out of a situation like that without the help of a doctor.'

Career achievements

Major results

1971
 1st Gent – Staden
 10th Ronde Van Vlaanderen Beloften
1973
 2nd Tour du Loir-et-Cher
 3rd Overall Tour de Romandie
 4th Overall Étoile des Espoirs
 6th Kattekoers
 9th Paris–Tours
1974
 4th Overall Vuelta a Andalucía
 4th Kampioenschap van Vlaanderen
 7th Boucles de l'Aulne
 7th Overall Tour de France
1st Stage 21b (ITT)
 9th Overall Tour de Luxembourg
1975
 1st Stage 13 Tour de France
 1st Stage 6 Critérium du Dauphiné Libéré
 2nd Overall Tour of Belgium
 2nd Brabantse Pijl
 2nd Trofeo Baracchi
 4th Paris–Brussels
 4th Druivenkoers Overijse
 5th Amstel Gold Race
 6th Kuurne–Brussels–Kuurne
 8th Overall Vuelta a Andalucía
 8th Gran Premio di Lugano
 10th Gent–Wevelgem
1976
 1st  Overall Tour of Belgium
1st Stage 3
 1st  Overall Escalada a Montjuïc
1st Stage 1c (ITT)
 1st Giro del Piemonte
 1st Stadsprijs Geraardsbergen
 1st Trofeo Baracchi (with Freddy Maertens)
 2nd Overall Tour de Suisse
1st Stages 2, 4a & 9b (ITT)
 4th Overall Ronde van Nederland
 7th Overall Tour de France
1st Stage 16
 8th Grand Prix de Wallonie
 10th Züri-Metzgete
1977
 1st  Road race, National Road Championships
 1st  Overall Giro d'Italia
1st Stage 21 (ITT)
 1st  Overall Tour de Suisse
1st Prologue, Stages 3a, 3b (ITT) & 9b (ITT)
 1st Gouden Pijl Emmen
 2nd Grand Prix of Aargau Canton
 3rd Setmana Catalana de Ciclisme
 4th Grand Prix de Wallonie
 5th Tour of Flanders
 6th Overall Vuelta a España
1st Stage 4 (ITT)
 7th Trofeo Laigueglia
 8th Liège–Bastogne–Liège
1978
 1st  Road race, National Road Championships
 1st  Overall Critérium du Dauphiné Libéré
 1st Stages 5 & 7b (ITT)
 1st  Overall Escalada a Montjuïc
1st Stages 1a (ITT), 1b & 1c (ITT)
 1st  Overall Vuelta a Mallorca
1st Stages 1a & 2a 
 2nd Tour of Flanders
 4th Overall Tour of Belgium
 4th Omloop van het Houtland
 5th Overall Tirreno–Adriatico
 5th La Flèche Wallonne
 5th Critérium des As
 6th Brabantse Pijl
 8th Overall Tour de Suisse
1st Stages 4b (ITT) & 9b (ITT)
 10th Giro di Lombardia
 10th Gent–Wevelgem
1979
 1st GP du Tournaisis
 3rd Overall Vuelta a España
 3rd E3 Prijs Vlaanderen
 4th Overall Tour of Belgium
 4th Brabantse Pijl
 5th Omloop Het Volk
 7th Overall Tirreno–Adriatico
 7th Liège–Bastogne–Liège
1980
 1st Tour of Flanders
 1st Brabantse Pijl
 2nd Le Samyn
 5th Overall Tour of Belgium
 5th Road race, National Road Championships
 8th Overall Tirreno–Adriatico
1981
 8th Overall Étoile de Bessèges
1982
 1st Omloop van het Houtland
 2nd Overall Vuelta a España
 4th Tour of Flanders
 6th Road race, UCI Road World Championships
1983
 3rd Overall Three Days of De Panne
 7th Tour of Flanders
 7th La Flèche Wallonne
1984
 1st Stage 6 Vuelta a España

Grand Tour general classification results timeline

See also 
 List of doping cases in cycling

References

External links 
 
 
 Official Tour de France results for Michel Pollentier

1951 births
Living people
Belgian male cyclists
Belgian sportspeople in doping cases
Belgian Tour de France stage winners
Belgian Vuelta a España stage winners
Doping cases in cycling
Giro d'Italia winners
People from Diksmuide
Sportspeople from West Flanders
Tour de Suisse stage winners